Yadunath Baskey (1926/1927 – 1 June 2022) was an Indian politician and a tribal leader. Baskey was a Tribal Welfare Minister in the Karpoori Thakur's Government of undivided Bihar in 1971, he represented Ghatshila constituency on a Jharkhand Party ticket as MLA in 1969. Baskey played a vital role in the fight for a separate Jharkhand state.

Baskey died on 1 June 2022 while undergoing treatment at Swarnarekha Nursing Home in Ghatshila, and cremated on Thursday with full state honors in Rangamatia village in Mediya Panchayat of Musabani block.

References 

1920s births
2022 deaths
Year of birth uncertain
People from East Singhbhum district
Jharkhand Party politicians
Santali people
Adivasi politicians
Bihar MLAs 1969–1972